This is a list of airports in Colombia, grouped by type and sorted by location.



Airports 

Airport names shown in bold indicate the airport has scheduled service on commercial airlines.

Notes
  The served town of Chía is located in Cundinamarca Department, but the airport lies in the Capital District of Bogotá.
  The served town of Girardot is located in Cundinamarca Department, but the airport lies in the Tolima Department.

References 

 
 
 World Aero Data: Airports in Colombia
 Great Circle Mapper: Airports in Colombia

See also 
 Colombian Air Force (Fuerza Aérea Colombiana)
 Transport in Colombia
 List of airports by ICAO code: S#SK - Colombia
 Wikipedia: WikiProject Aviation/Airline destination lists: South America#Colombia

Colombia
 
Airports
Airports
Colombia